The 1998 West Coast Conference men's basketball tournament took place on February 28–March 2, 1998. All rounds were held in Santa Clara, California, at the Toso Pavilion.

The San Francisco Dons won the WCC Tournament title and an automatic bid to the 1998 NCAA tournament. Hakeem Ward of San Francisco was named Tournament MVP.

Format
With eight teams participating, all eight teams were placed into the first round, with teams seeded and paired based on regular-season records. After the first round, teams were re-seeded so the highest-remaining team was paired with the lowest-remaining time in one semifinal with the other two teams slotted into the other semifinal.

Bracket

* – denotes overtime period

References

1997–98 West Coast Conference men's basketball season
West Coast Conference men's basketball tournament
West Coast Athletic Conference men's basketball tournament
West Coast Athletic Conference men's basketball tournament
West Coast Athletic Conference men's basketball tournament